King Creole is an album by Christer Sjögren, released 15 February 2006. The albums consists of recordings of songs previously recorded by Elvis Presley.

Track listing
King Creole
Burning Love
Love Me
You'll Never Walk Alone
I Need Your Love Tonight
Blue Suede Shoes
Kiss Me Quick
There Goes My Everything
You Gave Me a Mountain
Bossa Nova Baby     
Don't
Stuck on You
Teddy Bear
Let it Be Me
Hound Dog
Hurt
I'll Remember You
How Great Thou Art

Contributors
Christer Sjögren - vocals
Per Lindvall - drums, percussion
Rutger Gunnarsson - bass
Peter Ljung - piano, keyboard
LÖasse Wellander - guitar
Sebastian Nylund - guitar
Leif Lindwall - trumpet
Lennart Sjöholm - producer
Svea Strings

Charts

References 

2006 albums
Christer Sjögren albums